Military brothels were set up by Nazi Germany during World War II throughout much of occupied Europe for the use of Wehrmacht and SS soldiers. These brothels were generally new creations, but in the west, they were sometimes set up using existing brothels as well as many other buildings. Until 1942, there were around 500 military brothels of this kind in German-occupied Europe. Often operating in confiscated hotels and guarded by the Wehrmacht, these facilities served travelling soldiers and those withdrawn from the front. According to records, at least 34,140 European women were forced to serve as prostitutes during the German occupation of their own countries along with female prisoners of concentration camp brothels.

Eastern Europe 

The Foreign Ministry of the Polish Government in Exile issued a document on May 3, 1941, describing the mass kidnapping raids conducted in Polish cities with the aim of capturing young women for sexual slavery at brothels run by the German military. On top of that, Polish girls as young as 15 – classified as suitable for slave labor and shipped to Germany – were sexually exploited by German men. In Brandenburg, two Polish Ostarbeiter teens who returned home to Kraków in advanced stage of pregnancy, reported to have been raped by German soldiers with such frequency that they were unable to perform any of the worker's designated labour.

The Swiss Red Cross mission driver Franz Mawick wrote in 1942 from Warsaw about what he saw: "Uniformed Germans ... gaze fixedly at women and girls between the ages of 15 and 25. One of the soldiers pulls out a pocket flashlight and shines it on one of the women, straight into her eyes. The two women turn their pale faces to us, expressing weariness and resignation. The first one is about 30 years old. 'What is this old whore looking for around here?' – one of the three soldiers laughs. 'Bread, sir' – asks the woman. ... 'A kick in the ass you get, not bread' – answers the soldier. Owner of the flashlight directs the light again on the faces and bodies of girls. ... The youngest is maybe 15 years old ... They open her coat and start groping her with their lustfull paws. 'This one is ideal for bed' – he says."

In the Soviet Union, women were kidnapped by German forces for prostitution as well; one report by International Military Tribunal writes: "in the city of Smolensk the German Command  opened a brothel for officers in one of the hotels into which hundreds of women and girls were driven; they were mercilessly dragged down the street by their arms and hair."

Escape attempts
According to an exposé by the Polish Wprost magazine, the women forced into sexual slavery by the Nazi German authorities sometimes tried to escape. In one such instance, a group of Polish and Soviet women imprisoned at a German military brothel located in Norway escaped in 1941. They found refuge in the local Lutheran Church which offered them asylum. The women were raped by up to 32 men per day; the visiting soldiers were allocated 15 minutes each at a nominal cost of 3 Reichsmarks per "session" between the hours of 2 p.m. and 8.30 p.m. The women who were visibly pregnant were sometimes released, but would not go back to their families, so as not to shame them.

Occupied France 
The Wehrmacht was able to establish a thoroughly bureaucratic system of around 100 new brothels already before 1942, based on an existing system of government-controlled ones – wrote Inse Meinen. The soldiers were given official visitation cards issued by Oberkommando des Heeres and were prohibited from engaging in sexual contact with other French women. In September 1941, Field Marshal von Brauchitsch suggested that weekly visits for all younger soldiers be considered mandatory to prevent "sexual excesses" among them. The prostitutes had a scheduled medical check-up to slow the spread of sexually transmitted diseases.

Forced prostitution 
A 1977 German report by a neoconservative historian from Baden-Württemberg, Franz W. Seidler, contended that the foreign women who were made to register for the German military brothels had been prostitutes already before the war. Ruth Seifert, professor of sociology at the University of Applied Sciences in Regensburg, on the other hand, maintained that women were forced to work in these brothels by their German captors, as shown during the Trial of the Major War Criminals before the International Military Tribunal in Nuremberg in 1946, further confirmed by the 1961 book published by Raul Hilberg.

There were some prostitutes primarily in Western Europe who volunteered to work in the brothels, rather than to be sent to a concentration camp.

See also 
Sexual slavery
Wartime sexual violence
Forced prostitution
Roundup (history) (Łapanka)
 Comfort women (Japan) and Wianbu (South Korea)
 German war crimes
 House of Dolls novella about the Joy Division (WWII)
 Nazi crimes against the Polish nation
 German mistreatment of Soviet prisoners of war 
 Recreation and Amusement Association (Japan)
 Sexual slavery by Germany during World War II
 War rape by German forces during World War II

Notes

References
 
 
 
 
 
 
 

Military history of Germany during World War II
Prostitution in Germany
Unfree labor during World War II
Wartime sexual violence in World War II
Military brothels
Forced prostitution